The Chief Commissioner of Rodrigues is the gubernatorial head of the region of Rodrigues since it  gained autonomy within the Republic of Mauritius on 12 October 2002. The Commissioner is selected from the party holding the majority of seats at the regional assembly.

Overview

Responsibilities 
Since 5 March 2012, the Chief Commissioner Johnson Roussety was assigned the following responsibilities.

 Central Administration
 Civil Aviation (Administration)
 Civil Status
 Customs and Excise (Administration)
 Judicial (Administration)
 Legal Services
 Marine Services (Administration)
 Meteorology (Administration)
 Education (Administration)
 Arts and Culture
 Historical sites and Buildings
 State Lands
 Town and Country Planning
 Fire Services
 Prisons and Reform Institutions (Administration)
 Cooperatives
 Agriculture
 Food Production
 Plant and Animal Quarantine
 Statistics in respect of Rodrigues
 Registration
 Postal Services (Administration)

List of Chief Commissioner
This is a list of Chief Commissioners of Rodrigues.

See also

 Chief Executive of Rodrigues
 Politics of Mauritius

References

Rodrigues
Government of Mauritius
Mauritian politicians
Political office-holders in Mauritius